Alda Mangini (1914–1954) was an Italian singer and film actress. She appeared in several films alongside the Neapolitan comedian Totò.

She was married to the singer Alfredo Clerici.

Filmography

References

Bibliography
 Mauricio Ponzi. The films of Gina Lollobrigida. Citadel Press, 1982.

External links

1914 births
1954 deaths
Italian film actresses
Actresses from Milan